Rabbi Doniel Lander is the chancellor of Touro University and the Rosh Yeshiva of Yeshivas Ohr HaChaim, Mesivta Yesodei Yeshurun in Queens, NY, Mesivta Yesodei Hatorah in Waterbury, CT, and Mesivta Yesodei Yisroel in Elkins Park, PA (which will be closing its doors in June 2023).  Rabbi Lander's primarily role in Yeshivas Ohr Hachaim consists of giving lectures on a wide range of subjects. The Yeshiva follows the typical Lithuanian Yeshiva schedule of devoting each academic year to a specific Talmudic tractate. Rabbi Lander offers a high-level lecture to older students in the morning, afternoon lectures to the entire student body, Aggada-style drashos on shabbos, as well as a variety of other lectures to a range of audiences. His lectures are noted for their depth, clarity, and hallmark brilliance, echoing the style of his great teacher, Rabbi Joseph B. Soloveitchik. He holds a BA from Touro College an MBA from New York University, the latter of which was obtained exclusively during summer semesters, as he was a full-time student of the late Rabbi Joseph B. Soloveitchik, from whom he has private ordination.  He is the son of the late Rabbi Dr. Bernard Lander.

References

Touro College faculty
Yeshiva University alumni
Living people
Year of birth missing (living people)